František Maxián (9 November 1907 – 18 January 1971) was a Czech pianist and music educator.

(Another pianist of the same name was born in 1950. He graduated from the Academy of Performing Arts in Prague in 1975 as a pupil of Valentina Kamenikova, and in 1978 took part in the Young Performers' Cycle of the Prague Spring Festival.)

Life and performing career
František Maxián was born in Teplice. He studied at the local Conservatory as a student of Roman Vesely, then continued his studies at the Prague Conservatory with Vilém Kurz. After graduating, he worked as a pianist in Czech Radio. Later he returned to piano studies, and his solo performances began to attract attention. He began to perform internationally, and was elected Vice-Chairman of the Chopin Competition in Warsaw in 1949. Maxián performed a repertoire including both classical and contemporary composers. He died in 1971 and is buried not far from his teacher Vilém Kurz at Slavín, the Vyšehrad cemetery in Prague.

Career as an educator

From 1927 to 1928, Maxián was active as a music school teacher in Dubrovnik, and in 1939 became a professor at the Prague Conservatory. In 1946 he became a professor at the Prague Academy of Performing Arts. Notable students include Jan Panenka, Peter Toperczer, Marian Lapšanský, Josef Hala, Antonin Kubalek, E. Glancová and Sláva Vorlová.

References

1907 births
1971 deaths
Czech classical pianists
Prague Conservatory alumni
People from Teplice
Academic staff of the Prague Conservatory
20th-century classical pianists